Flags of Our Fathers (2000) is a book by James Bradley with Ron Powers about his father, Navy corpsman John Bradley, and five United States Marines, who were made famous by Joe Rosenthal’s Raising the Flag on Iwo Jima photograph. The story follows the lives of Bradley, Rene Gagnon, Ira Hamilton Hayes, Michael Strank, Harlon Henry Block, and Franklin Runyon Sousley. The five Marines were a part of Easy Company, 28th Marines, 5th Marine Division. Strank was a sergeant, Block was a corporal who reported to Strank, and the rest of the Marines were privates first class.  John Bradley was a Navy corpsman who administered first aid to Easy Company. 

The book is focused mainly on the Battle of Iwo Jima and the Marines who made the battle famous. The fighting on Iwo Jima was the only time in all of WWII in which US Marines suffered more casualties than the Japanese. Whilst the battle was still raging Rosenthal's photograph of the Marines was released and overnight gained the attention of the whole nation. In the following weeks Strank, Block, and Sousley were killed in battle and their families were notified. Bradley, Gagnon, and Hayes were sent on the 7th War Bond Drive and became public heroes. Even though the boys war was finished and they had raised money for their country their fight was far from over. Many of the Marines had a very hard time moving on with life after their experiences in war and the book sheds light on some of these hardships.

Controversy 
Following a Marine investigation into the event it was determined that two of the six Marines featured in the book were not in the famous photograph. The men misidentified were Gagnon and Bradley, the men who were actually in the photo are Harold “Pie” Keller and Harold Schultz who were also a part of Easy Company.

Critical reception 
The book spent 46 weeks on The New York Times nonfiction bestseller list, spending six weeks at number one.

Film adaptation 
Shortly after the book's publication, Steven Spielberg acquired the option for the film rights via DreamWorks Pictures. The film adaptation Flags of Our Fathers, which debuted in the U.S. on October 20, 2006, was directed by Clint Eastwood and produced by Eastwood, Steven Spielberg, and Robert Lorenz, with a screenplay written by William Broyles, Jr. and Paul Haggis.

References

External links 
eFilmCritic.com interview with James Bradley about Flags of Our Fathers 
Booknotes interview with Bradley on Flags of Our Fathers, July 9, 2000.

2000 non-fiction books
Bantam Books books
Battle of Iwo Jima
Biographies adapted into films
Non-fiction books about the United States Marine Corps
World War II memoirs